First Colonial High School is a high school in Virginia Beach, Virginia.  It is a part of the Virginia Beach City Public Schools.

Demographics
The demographic breakdown of the 2,039 students enrolled in 2013-14 was:
Male - 48.7%
Female - 51.3%
Native American/Alaskan - 0.3%
Asian/Pacific islanders - 2.5%
Black - 17.4%
Hispanic - 9.0%
White - 64.5%
Multiracial - 6.3%

26.5% of the students were eligible for free or reduced lunch.

Athletics
First Colonial offers many sports, including:

Baseball
State champs - 1993.
Basketball
Competition Cheer
Sideline Cheer
Cross Country
Field hockey
State champs - 2011, 2012 & 2015.
Football
Gymnastics
Indoor Track
Soccer
Girls state champs - 2018, 2021
Boys state champs - 2021
Softball
Swimming
Tennis
Girls state champs - 2011
Track
Volleyball
Boys state champs - 1997
Girls state champs - 2000, 2002 & 2014
Wrestling

Notable alumni
Wade Barrett - soccer player
Josh Boone - filmmaker
Derrick Borte - filmmaker
Steven Culp - actor
Raven Greene - football player
 Darryl Monroe - basketball player, 2016 Israeli Basketball Premier League MVP
Juice Newton - singer
Brandon Noble - football player
Mark Reynolds - baseball player
Aaron Rouse - football player and politician
Mark Ruffalo - actor
Will Sessoms - politician
Kendra Todd - reality television personality
Regan Lipinski - reality television personality

See also
AAA Eastern Region
AAA Beach District

References

External links
 Virginia Beach City Public Schools
 First Colonial HS official site

Educational institutions established in 1966
Magnet schools in Virginia
High schools in Virginia Beach, Virginia
Public high schools in Virginia
1966 establishments in Virginia